The 1970–71 Mitropa Cup was the 31st season of the Mitropa Cup, a football tournament for European clubs. It was won by Čelik Zenica who beat Austria Salzburg 3–1 in the final.

Round of 16

|}

Quarter-finals

|}

Semi-finals

|}

Final

See also
1970–71 European Cup
1970–71 European Cup Winners' Cup
1970–71 Inter-Cities Fairs Cup

External links
1970–71 Mitropa Cup at Rec.Sport.Soccer Statistics Foundation

1969-70
1970–71 in European football
1970–71 in Hungarian football
1970–71 in Yugoslav football
1970–71 in Austrian football
1970–71 in Czechoslovak football
1970–71 in Italian football